Cheick Bongouta Cissé (born 25 October 1987 in Mali) is a Malian footballer who is last known to have played for Moroka Swallows of the South African National First Division.

Career

Mbabane Highlanders

Transferring to Swazi Premier League title contenders Mbabane Highlanders in 2008 and scoring a goal on his cup debut opposing Eleven Men, Cissé threatened to leave the club after not being paid for the six weeks since his arrival.

Moroka Swallows

On trial with Moroka Swallows of the South African top division, the Malian striker officially penned a two-year deal with them in January 2011. However, after getting cleared to play, Cissé put in a torpid performance for the club despite being given 11 starts by coach Gordon Igesund in his first six months with the Swallows. This was coupled with injury, which caused him to be finally released by the South African outfit in 2013.

References

External links 
 Moroka Swallows' Malian striker Cheick Cisse is confident that his country is going to beat Nigeria
 at Soccerway

Living people
Malian expatriate footballers
Association football forwards
1987 births
Expatriate soccer players in South Africa
Malian footballers
South African Premier Division players
Moroka Swallows F.C. players
Expatriate footballers in Eswatini
Mbabane Swallows players
21st-century Malian people